Pierre-Étienne de Perier (31 October 1893 – 22 June 1968) was a French divisional general., Grand Officer of the Legion of Honour, and magazine editor.

Early life

Origins 

Antoine Pierre-Étienne de Perier came from a family from Normandy. Its coat of arms bear "Silver, a fess of vert accompanied by four cinquefoils of the same laid one to each canton of the shield". 

He was born on 31 October 1893 in Laghouat, French Algeria, to Antoine Léonor de Perier (1842-1908), commander of the 2nd Battalion of African Light Infantry and Officer of the Legion of Honour, and Louise Loubère (1862-1939), daughter of colonel Jean-Louis Loubère, governor of French Guiana.  

Antoine Léonor de Perier, born in Pressagny-l'Orgueilleux where his father Antoine René de Perier (1800-1880), the mayor of the village,  owned the château of la Madeleine, enlisted as a private in 1859 before becoming an officer in 1867. General de Perier's great-grandfather, colonel Antoine Daniel de Perier d'Oudalle (1751-1844), commanded the first brigade of the sedentary National Guard of Rouen.

Education 
De Perier entered the École spéciale militaire de Saint-Cyr, class of Montmirail (1912-1914), and enlisted the same year, quickly being promoted to corporal.

Service during World War I 

On 28 August 1914, in the battle of La Besace (Ardennes), he was seriously wounded in the jaw by a bullet while charging the Germans. This action earned him a mention in the army order: "Well behaved in combat on 28 August 1914, brilliantly charged with the bayonet at the head of his section, was seriously wounded ". In 1916, he was posted to the Armée d'Orient, and became a captain in the Zouaves in 1917.

Inter-war period 
Regional topographer in Morocco from 1919 to 1921, he joined the colonial infantry. He was sent to Germany, in the French army of the Rhineland, from 1921 to 1925.

Then a commander, he was aide-de-camp to General Franchet d'Esperey from 1932 to 1934.

Service during World War II 

In June 1940, the Third Army, of which he was sub-chief of staff, was surrounded in Lorraine by Guderian, who led Operation Tiger. De Perier was captured by the Nazis but managed to escape : "was particularly noted for his initiative, energy and courage during the period from 1 June to 22 June 1940. Taken prisoner after the encirclement of his army, he escaped and managed to elude the horsemen in pursuit and reached the unoccupied zone of French territory after having circulated for eight days in the German lines". He was awarded the Escapees' medal by decree in 1945.

From September 1940 to May 1942, promoted to colonel, he became chief of staff to General Maxime Weygand.

In 1941, the African Army had to be put in a position to enter the campaign. To this end, it was necessary to complete its units, create security formations to replace the garrisons and reconstitute their maintenance services. These objectives could only be achieved by mobilization, which colonel de Perier decided to do.

From 1942, he took part in the Tunisian campaign.

Service during First Indochina War 

Inspector general of Colonial troops in October 1944, he was assistant to generals Valluy and Salan during the First Indochina War. He was cited in the army order in 1947.

End of his career 
In 1948, de Perier was heard at Weygand's trial before the High Court. He gave a long deposition in which he defended the accused.

He chaired the Revue économique française when it was reissued in 1952 under the Société de Géographie commerciale. This journal dealt with economic issues and overseas territories

After his retirement in 1950, general de Perier died on 22 June 1968 in Paris and was buried in Allier.

Military ranks 

 Aspirant (11 October 1913)
 Second lieutenant (5 August 1914)
 Captain (6 July 1917)
 Commander (25 December 1929)
 Lieutenant-colonel (24 March 1936)
 Colonel (25 June 1940)
 Brigadier general (1 June 1943)
 Divisional general (1 November 1950)

Decorations

French, French Colonial or Inter-Allied decorations 

  Croix de guerre des théâtres d'opération extérieurs 
  Croix de guerre 1914-1918
  Croix de guerre 1939-1945
  Escapees' Medal (1945)
  Grand Officer of the Legion of Honour (1950)
  Cross for Military Valour
  Morocco commemorative medal
  Victory Medal 1914-1918
  1914–1918 Commemorative war medal
  Combatant's Cross
  Orient campaign medal
 Medal for the War Wounded

Foreign decorations 

 Moroccan Peace Medal
  Commemorative Cross for the 1914-1918 Liberation War and the Union
  Order of Ouissam Alaouite

Works 

 Study on the landings by sea in the French Military Review

References

Archives 

 Defence Historical Service, GR YD 321 "general de Perier"

Further reading 
 Raoul Salan, Le Viêt-minh mon adversaire. Presses de la Cité, 1971
 Maxime Weygand, Mémoires : rappelé au service, 1950

1893 births
1968 deaths
French generals
French military personnel of World War I
École Spéciale Militaire de Saint-Cyr alumni
Recipients of the Croix de Guerre 1939–1945 (France)
Recipients of the Croix de guerre des théâtres d'opérations extérieures
19th-century French military personnel
Recipients of the Cross for Military Valour
People from Laghouat
French military personnel of World War II
French magazine editors
Recipients of the Croix de Guerre 1914–1918 (France)
Grand Officiers of the Légion d'honneur